Gordon E. Sawyer (27 August 1905 – 15 May 1980) was sound director at Samuel Goldwyn Productions. He won 3 Oscars for Best Sound and was nominated a further 13 times.

Selected filmography
Sawyer won three Academy Awards and was nominated for 13 more:

Won
 The Bishop's Wife (1947)
 The Alamo (1960)
 West Side Story (1961)

Nominated
 Wonder Man (1945)
 The Best Years of Our Lives (1946)
 Our Very Own (1950)
 I Want You (1951)
 Hans Christian Andersen (1952)
 Friendly Persuasion (1956)
 Witness for the Prosecution (1957)
 I Want to Live! (1958)
 Porgy and Bess (1959)
 The Apartment (1960)
 The Loudest Whisper (1961)
 It's a Mad, Mad, Mad, Mad World (1963)
 Hawaii (1966)

Legacy 
The Gordon E. Sawyer award was instituted at the Academy Awards in 1981 *Gordon E. Sawyer Award

References

External links

Gordon E. Sawyer - Sound Director on Yahoo! Movies

1905 births
1980 deaths
American audio engineers
Metro-Goldwyn-Mayer executives
Best Sound Mixing Academy Award winners
People from Santa Barbara, California
Recipients of the John A. Bonner Medal of Commendation
20th-century American businesspeople
Engineers from California
20th-century American engineers